The “Asociación Mexicana de Cineastas Independientes”, Spanish for Mexican Association of Independent Filmmakers is an association that promotes and supports a film school in Mexico. The association produces almost 150 short films a year, many showing at international festivals.

History
It was founded on 1993 by a group of teachers and students breaking up from the New York Film Academy, Centro de Capacitación Cinematográfica and Centro Universitario de Estudios Cinematográficos. It has grown since to become a recognized university with strong presence in the industry. Its campus was originally built on the Magdalena Contreras borough. However, it was then moved to a new location near downtown Mexico.

The association aims not only to provide a comprehensive theoretical and practical cinema education, but also to exist as a business-related social networking environment and community for its students, faculty members and staff.

Academic offerings

Degree Programs
The association currently offers different bachelor programs in Film Business, Acting and Filmmaking. The university has a reputation for trying to accredit their programs by external organisms. Some studies can be done either in the open system.

Intensive one-year programs
 One-Year Cinematography
 One-Year Acting

Intensive filmmaking programs
 Two-Year Associate in Fine Arts in Cinematography
 Two-Year Associate in Fine Arts in Acting

Bachelor's Degree
 Intensive four year BFA program

Master of Fine Arts degree program
 MFA in Directing
 MFA in Screenwriting
 MFA in Producing
 MFA in Acting for Film
 MFA in Cinematography
 MFA in Musical Theatre

Workshops
The Film Workshops were established in response to the film, television and interactive media industries' desire to develop lasting partnerships with further and higher education institutions. The Academies seek to provide an answer to industries need for fresh talent and innovation.
Hands-on intensive workshops

 5 Week Filmmaking Workshop
 8 Week Filmmaking Workshop
 12 Week Filmmaking Workshop
 4 Week Acting Workshop
 12 Week Acting Workshop
 1 Week Hollywood Production Workshop
 14 Week Film Business Workshop
 16 Week Phrase and Singing Workshop
 8 Week Drama and Literary Analysis Workshop
 8 Week Editing Workshop
 3 Week Stopmotion Animation Workshop
 2 Week Summer Camp for Teens
 12 Week Summer Camp for Teens

References

External links
 AMCI 

Film schools in Mexico
Private universities and colleges in Mexico
Universities in Mexico City